The 2022 South Alabama Jaguars football team represented the University of South Alabama as a member of the Sun Belt Conference during the 2022 NCAA Division I FBS football season. They were led by head coach Kane Wommack, who was coaching his second season with the team. The Jaguars played their home games at Hancock Whitney Stadium in Mobile, Alabama.

Previous season

2022 NFL Draft

Preseason

Recruiting class

|}
Source:

Award watch lists
Listed in the order that they were released

Preseason

Sources:

Sun Belt coaches poll
The Sun Belt coaches poll was released on July 25, 2022. The Jaguars were picked to finish second in the West Division.

Sun Belt Preseason All-Conference teams

Offense

2nd team
Jalen Wayne – Wide Receiver, SR

Defense

1st team
Darrell Luter Jr. – Defensive Back, SR
Keith Gallmon Jr. – Defensive Back, SR

Personnel

Schedule
South Alabama and the Sun Belt Conference announced the 2022 football schedule on March 1, 2022.

Game summaries

Nicholls

at Central Michigan

at UCLA

Louisiana Tech

at Louisiana

Louisiana-Monroe

Troy

at Arkansas State

at Georgia Southern

Texas State

at Southern Miss

Old Dominion

Statistics

vs. Western Kentucky (New Orleans Bowl)

Rankings

References

South Alabama
South Alabama Jaguars football seasons
South Alabama Jaguars football